Love American Style is the second studio album by noise rock band The Honeymoon Killers, independently released in 1985 by Fur Records.

Release and reception 
Critics of the Trouser Press described Love American Style as a "crunching descent into lighthearted sonic warfare"

Track listing

Personnel 
Adapted from the Love American Style liner notes.

The Honeymoon Killers
 Sally Edroso – drums, vocals
 Jerry Teel – electric guitar, harmonica, vocals, cover art
 Lisa Wells – bass guitar, vocals

Production and additional personnel
 The Honeymoon Killers – production
 Steve McAllister – engineering

Release history

References

External links 
 Love American Style at Discogs (list of releases)

1985 albums
The Honeymoon Killers (American band) albums